The 26th Space Aggressor Squadron is a unit of the United States Air Force located at Schriever Air Force Base, Colorado. It is part of the 926th Group and is the reserve associate of the 527th Space Aggressor Squadron.

The mission of the 26th Space Aggressor Squadron is to replicate enemy threats to space-based and space-enabled systems during tests and training exercises. By using Global Positioning System and satellite communications jamming techniques, it provides Air Force, joint and coalition military personnel with an understanding of how to recognize, mitigate, counter and defeat these threats.

The 26th's tasks are to know, teach and replicate a wide array of terrestrial and space threats to the U.S. military's space enablers. The squadron 
trains the warfighter to operate in an environment where systems like GPS and SATCOM interfered with or denied—preparing them for the current and future fights.

History

Founded in 1914, the 26th is the oldest squadron in the Air Force Reserve and one of the oldest in the United States Air Force. The squadron was organized as the 1st Reserve Aero Squadron on 26 May 1917, the first squadron of what would become the United States Air Force Reserve in 1948.

Origins
Elements of the squadron date to November 1915 when it was organized as part of the New York National Guard as the Aviation Detachment, First Battalion Signal Corps, New York National Guard, and shortly thereafter as the 1st Aero Company.

The 1st Aero Company was provisionally recognized by the federal government on 22 June 1916 and brought to U.S. service on 13 July 1916, with the objective of sending personnel and equipment to the 1st Aero Squadron in Mexico with the punitive expedition under General John J. Pershing.  After being federalized, the company began training on 22 July at the new Mineola Signal Corps Aviation School under two Regular Army instructors assigned by the Signal Corps. The Army eventually trained 25 pilots but the 1st Aero Company was mustered out of federal service on 2 November 1916 without ever leaving Long Island, and was disbanded on 23 May 1917.

In the meantime, the National Defense Act of 1916, passed on 3 June, authorized an aviation section in the Signal Reserve Corps of 296 officers and 2,000 enlisted men as part of the Army's Aviation Section, U.S. Signal Corps.  At Fort Jay, New York, attorney Phillip A. Carroll established the Governors Island Training Corps, a privately funded program to train civilians to pass the Reserve Military Aviator flying test and receive commissions in the Signal Officers Reserve Corps.  The instructional program was under the guidance of the Army's Eastern Department, commanded by Major Gen. Leonard Wood, and trained seven civilians who were commissioned as Reserve Military Aviators.

World War I
After the United States' entry into World War I, the unit, less New York guardsmen and the new Reserve military Aviators were organized into a new unit at Mineola by Major Raynal Bolling and now-Captain Carroll. Federalized in June 1917, the 1st Reserve Aero Squadron trained during the summer of 1917 and sailed for Europe aboard the RMS Baltic on 23 August with eight other aero squadrons. Reaching France in Le Havre, on 17 September, it arrived at its duty station at Issoudun Aerodrome, home of the Third Aviation Instruction Center, on 21 September. After receiving further training in French schools in Pau and Tours Aerodrome until November, it assembled, serviced, and repaired aircraft. The 1st was redesignated as the 26th Aero Squadron on 1 October 1917 as part of a reorganization of the Air Service of the AEF.  The 26th Aero Squadron left Issoudun on 13 April 1919, and remained in France until May 1919 when the unit returned to the United States and was demobilized.

Interwar period
The 26 Squadron (Attack) was authorized on 30 August 1921 and the following month was organized and assigned to the 3d Attack Group at Kelly Field, Texas. It was assigned various World War I era biplanes and experimental American aircraft of the 1920s, the squadron patrolled the Mexican Border, delivered airmail and performed other missions as assigned until inactivating in 1924, shortly after consolidating with the World War I 26th Aero Squadron.

The squadron was reactivated as the 26th Attack Squadron in Hawaii in 1930.  It was equipped with Curtiss A-3 Falcons, which were used as fighter-bombers in the 1930s as part of the defense of the islands.   Newer Douglas B-18 Bolos were assigned in late 1939, and the unit was redesignated as the 26th Bombardment Squadron. The B-18s were relegated to second-line patrol duty over the approaches to Oahu in 1941 when Boeing B-17E Flying Fortresses arrived in Hawaii.

World War II
During the Pearl Harbor Attack, many of the squadron's aircraft were damaged at Hickam Field, and the survivors were reformed at Wheeler Field, where they were retained as part of the defense force of the territory under the new Seventh Air Force. The squadron deployed B-17s to Midway Island in late May 1942 to strengthen the island's defenses, however they were withdrawn prior to the Japanese attack on the airfield. They returned to Midway and attempted to raid the attacking Japanese naval forces with little success, and returned to Wheeler Field after the battle ended on 8 June.

The squadron deployed to the South Pacific and came under the new Thirteenth Air Force.  Operating from the New Hebrides, the B-17s attacked enemy targets in the Solomon Islands during late 1942 as well as targets in New Guinea and other enemy-controlled areas in the South Pacific Area.  The B-17s were flown to Australia from New Guinea in early 1943 and squadron personnel returned to Hawaii for re-equipping and replacement personnel. Was re-equipped with very long range Consolidated B-24 Liberators optimized for long-range missions in the Pacific.  The squadron operated in the Central Pacific Area, flying very long-range heavy bombing missions over the Gilbert and Marshall Islands before moving west to Guam in the Northern Mariana Islands in October 1944. In 1945, Liberators from the squadron carried out very long range bombing attacks on Okinawa, eventually being stationed on Okinawa after the Japanese Capitulation in August 1945. In September 1945, immediately post-war, the planes were used to ferry former prisoners of war to Manila. The squadron was demobilized on Okinawa after the war, with aircraft being sent to the Philippines for reclamation. The 26th Bombardment Squadron still existed as a paper Boeing B-29 Superfortress very heavy bombardment squadron by Far East Air Forces until inactivation in late 1948, never being equipped or manned.

Strategic Air Command bomber operations
Reactivated under Strategic Air Command in December 1948 at Carswell Air Force Base, Texas; received the new Convair B-36B Peacemaker intercontinental strategic bomber. Upgraded to the jet-assisted B-36D in 1950, then the B-36J-III Featherweight in 1954; Trained in heavy bombardment operations and participated in many SAC exercises and deployments. In 1958 moved to Altus Air Force Base, Oklahoma and re-equipped with new Boeing B-52E Stratofortresses and continued operations as well as standing nuclear alert.  Remained at Altus on alert status until B-52Es were phased out of SAC service and consigned to storage in 1968.  Afterward the squadron was inactivated.

Fighter and aggressor operations

Reactivated under Pacific Air Forces (PACAF) at Clark Air Base, Philippines in 1973 with a training mission to provide dissimilar air combat training to PACAF fighter squadrons using Soviet-style fighter tactics. It was carried in non-operational status until the end of August 1975, by which time the 405th Fighter Wing had been replaced by the 3rd Tactical Fighter Wing at Clark. Even then, it did not start training activities until January 1976, using a number of Northrop T-38 Talon aircraft made surplus by the arrival of the Northrop F-5E Tiger IIs at Nellis Air Force Base, Nevada. Eventually, the squadron also received the F-5E, with some of the planes coming from stocks destined for the Republic of Vietnam Air Force but never delivered and an embargoed Ethiopian Air Force order. By that time it had been redesignated the 26th Tactical Fighter Training Squadron, and secondly as a Tactical Fighter Training and Aggressor Squadron. Eventually, it became the 26th Aggressor Squadron.  The aggressor F-5Es were painted in a variety of colorful camouflage schemes designed to mimic those in use by Warsaw Pact aircraft. Two-digit Soviet-style nose codes were applied to most aggressor aircraft, and these coincided with the last two digits of the serial number. When there was duplication, three digits were used. Squadron was among the first to apply the star and bar in toned-down or stencil form.

By the late 1980s, the aircraft were becoming worn out after years of high-performance fighter training, with some aircraft being grounded for structural failures.   In addition, the F-5E no longer could provide the training as a new generation of Soviet aircraft were becoming operational.  The 26th at Clark was scheduled to dispose of its F-5Es in favor of General Dynamics F-16 Fighting Falcon and move to Kadena Air Base, Okinawa, in October 1988.  The unit was minimally manned at Kadena while the squadron awaited new aircraft, flying a few borrowed aircraft from the 18th Tactical Fighter Wing.  However, in 1990, the decision was made to terminate the entire USAF aggressor program. The 26th AS was inactivated on 21 February 1990 before it could receive its own F-16s.

Space aggressor unit
Reactivated under Air Force Space Command in 2003 as the 26th Space Aggressor Squadron as part of the 310th Space Wing at Schriever Air Force Base, Colorado.  In 2007 the unit was reassigned to the 926th Group at Nellis and was transferred to Air Combat Command.  However, the 26th remained at Schriever AFB, despite the reorganization as a geographically separated unit.

Lineage
 26th Aero Squadron
 Organized as the 1st Reserve Aero Squadron on 26 May 1917
 Redesignated 26th Aero Squadron on 1 October 1917
 Demobilized on 7 June 1919
 Reconstituted and consolidated with the 26th Attack Squadron as the 26th Attack Squadron on 8 April 1924

 26th Space Aggressor Squadron
 Authorized as the 26th Squadron (Attack) on 30 August 1921
 Organized on 15 September 1921
 Redesignated 26th Attack Squadron on 25 January 1923
 Consolidated with the 26th Aero Squadron on 8 April 1924
 Inactivated on 27 June 1924
 Activated on 1 September 1930
 Redesignated 26th Bombardment Squadron (Medium) on 6 December 1939
 Redesignated 26th Bombardment Squadron (Heavy) on 11 December 1940
 Redesignated 26th Bombardment Squadron, Heavy c. 3 August 1944
 Redesignated 26th Bombardment Squadron, Very Heavy on 30 April 1946
 Inactivated on 20 October 1948
 Redesignated 26th Bombardment Squadron, Heavy and activated on 1 December 1948
 Discontinued and inactivated on 2 July 1968
 Redesignated 26th Tactical Fighter Squadron on 24 September 1973
 Activated on 30 September 1973
 Redesignated 26th Tactical Fighter Training Squadron on 31 August 1975
 Redesignated 26th Tactical Fighter Training Aggressor Squadron on 30 November 1977
 Redesignated 26th Aggressor Squadron on 22 April 1983
 Inactivated on 21 February 1990
 Redesignated 26th Space Aggressor Squadron on 21 February 2003
 Activated in the reserve on 1 October 2003

Assignments
 Eastern Department, 26 May 1917
 Third Aviation Instruction Center, c. September 1917
 Unknown, April–7 June 1919
 3d Attack Group, 15 September 1921 – 27 June 1924
 5th Composite Group (later 5 Bombardment Group), 1 September 1930 (attached to 18th Pursuit Group)
 18th Wing, 12 October 1938 (attached to 18th Pursuit Group until c. 10 December 1939)
 11th Bombardment Group, 1 February 1940 – 20 October 1948
 11th Bombardment Group, 1 December 1948 (attached to 11th Bombardment Wing after 16 February 1951)
 11th Bombardment Wing (later 11th Strategic Aerospace Wing), 16 June 1952 – 2 July 1968
 405th Fighter Wing, 30 September 1973
 3d Tactical Fighter Wing, 16 September 1974
 18th Tactical Fighter Wing, 1 October 1988 – 21 February 1990
 310th Space Group, 1 October 2003
 926th Group (later 926th Wing), 17 August 2007 – present

Stations

 Hazelhurst Field, New York, 26 May–23 Aug 1917
 Le Havre, France, 17 September 1917
 Issoudun Aerodrome, France, 20 September 1917
 Detachments trained at Pau and Tours Aerodrome, France, 28 September-Nov 1917
 Clisson, France, 13 April 1919
 St Sebastien sur Loire, France, 1 May 1919
 St Nazaire, France, 5–13 May 1919
 Mitchel Field, New York, 27 May-7 Jun 1919
 Kelly Field, Texas, 15 September 1921 – 27 June 1924
 Wheeler Field, Hawaii, 1 September 1930
 Hickam Field, Hawaii, 1 February 1940
 Wheeler Field, Hawaii, 20 December 1941 – 19 July 1942
 Operated from Midway Island, 30 May-2 Jun 1942 and 5-c. 8 June 1942
 Efate Airfield, Efate, New Hebrides, 25 July 1942
 Forward echelon operated from: Turtle Bay Airfield, Espiritu Santo, New Hebrides, August 1942
 Forward echelon operated from: Henderson Field (Guadalcanal), September 1942
 Pekoa Airfield, Espiritu Santo, New Hebrides, 22 December 1942 – 28 March 1943
 Forward echelon operated from: Dobodura Airfield Complex, New Guinea, January 1943
 Bellows Field, Hawaii, 12 April 1943
 Wheeler Field, Hawaii, 11 May 1943
 Operated from: Canton Island Airport, Phoenix Islands, August–September 1943

 Nukufetau Airfield, Ellice Islands, 11 November 1943
 Air echelon operated from Canton Island Airfield, Phoenix Islands, 12 November-31 December 1943
 Hawkins Field (Tarawa), Gilbert Islands, 25 January 1944
 Air echelon operated from Eniwetok Atoll Airfield, Marshall Islands, 29 March-17 April 1944
 Kwajalein Airfield, Marshall Islands, 14 April 1944
 Air echelon operated from Eniwetok Atoll Airfield, Marshall Islands, July 1944
 Agana Airfield, Guam, Northern Marianas Islands, 21 October 1944
 Yontan Airfield, Okinawa, Ryukyu Islands, 2 July 1945
 Fort McHenry, Luzon, Philippines, 13 December 1945
 Northwest Field (Guam), Northern Marianas Islands, 15 May 1946
 Harmon Field (later Harmon Air Force Base), Guam, Northern Marianas Islands, 1 May 1947 – 20 October 1948
 Carswell Air Force Base, Texas, 1 December 1948
 Deployed at Nouasseur Air Base, French Morocco, 28 June-29 July 1954 and 3 May-3 July 1955
 Altus Air Force Base, Oklahoma, 13 December 1957 – 2 July 1968
 Deployed at Clinton-Sherman Air Force Base, Oklahoma, 13 August-25 Nov 1958
 Clark Air Base, Philippines, 30 September 1973
 Kadena Air Base, Japan, 1 October 1988 – 21 February 1990
 Schriever Air Force Base, Colorado, 1 October 2003 – present

Aircraft

 Dayton-Wright DH-4, 1921-1924
 Included various experimental models including the "flying tank," 1921-1924
 Curtiss A-3 Falcon, 1930–1936
 Boeing PW-9, 1931
 Curtiss A-12 Shrike, 1936–1939
 Douglas B-18 Bolo, 1940–1942
 Boeing B-17 Flying Fortress, 1941–1943
 Consolidated B-24 Liberator, 1943–1945
 Convair B-36 Peacemaker, 1949–1957
 Boeing B-52 Stratofortress, 1958–1968
 Northrop T-38 Talon, 1975–1980
 Northrop F-5E Tiger II, 1977–1988
 Lockheed T-33 T-Bird, 1986–1987
 McDonnell Douglas F-15 Eagle (borrowed), 1988-1989
 General Dynamics F-16 Fighting Falcon (borrowed), 1988-1989

Campaigns
 World War I: Theater of Operations
 World War II: Central Pacific; Air Offensive, Japan; Papua; Guadalcanal; Northern Solomons; Eastern Mandates; Western Pacific; Ryukyus; China Offensive; Air Combat, Asiatic-Pacific Theater

Decorations
 Distinguished Unit Citation South Pacific, 31 July-30 November 1942
 Navy Presidential Unit Citation Pacific Theater, 7 August-9 December 1942
 Air Force Outstanding Unit Awards:
 6 August 1954 – 15 July 1957
 27 October 1958 – 16 September 1960
 1 May 1980 – 30 April 1982
 22 March-1 April 1986
 1 June 1987 – 31 May 1989

See also

 List of American Aero Squadrons
 List of B-52 Units of the United States Air Force

References

Notes
 Explanatory notes

 Citations

Bibliography

External links
 26thaggressors
 clarkab.com
 Airmen learn to counter satellite-jamming threats

Military units and formations in Colorado
Space Aggressor 026
Aggressor squadrons of the United States Air Force